Mike Griffith is a Republican member of the Maryland House of Delegates representing District 35B since January 7, 2020. Griffith was appointed by Maryland governor Larry Hogan after Andrew Cassilly resigned the seat to become a senior advisor to Hogan.

Early life and career
Griffith was born in Baltimore, Maryland and graduated from Joppatowne High School in Joppa, Maryland. In 1995, he joined the U.S. Marine Corps, serving as a military police officer, supervisor, and liaison until 2002. Upon his return to the United States, Griffith served on various community boards, including the Maryland Building Industry Association, the Harford County Economic Development Advisory Board, and the Arc Northern Chesapeake Region. Griffith entered into politics in 2018 by becoming a member of the Harford County Republican Central Committee. Griffith was elected the chair of the committee in 2019.

In the legislature
Griffith was sworn into the Maryland House of Delegates on January 7, 2020.

Committee assignments
 Ways and Means Committee, 2021–present
 Judiciary Committee, 2020–2021 (civil law & procedure subcommittee, 2020; juvenile law subcommittee, 2020; family & juvenile law subcommittee, 2021; public safety subcommittee, 2021; early childhood subcommittee, 2022–present; election law subcommittee, 2022–present)

Other memberships
 Member, Maryland Veterans Caucus, 2020–present (house executive board, 2022–present)

Political positions

Education
Griffith is an advocate for in-person learning, having supported students and parents in Harford County that pushed for schools to reopen amid the COVID-19 pandemic. In August 2020, Griffith signed a letter calling on the Harford County Board of Education to give parents the choice as to whether they want their child to return to school or to learn remotely, and giving teachers the same option.

During the 2021 legislative session, Griffith introduced two bills aimed at increasing aid to students with special needs. The first bill, the Education Equality for All Act, would require school systems to give parents the information and funding necessary to update their child’s individual education program; the bill passed and was signed into law by Governor Larry Hogan on May 18, 2021. The second bill, the Vulnerable Student Protection Act, would require schools to provide special education, behavioral health, counseling, and nutritional services on an in-person basis to at-risk students; the bill received a hearing in committee, but did not receive a vote. In February 2021, Griffith voted against an amendment that would create a fully elected seven member school board in Harford County, Maryland.

Policing
During a vote on a bill that would order police departments to provide body-worn cameras for on-duty officers, Griffith introduced an amendment that would require the state of Maryland to pay for the mandated body cameras. He later expressed concern that the bill would slow down officers' decision-making during dangerous situations and cost their lives.

Taxes
In 2020, Griffith attended a rally against a proposed measure that would extend Maryland's sales tax to several professional services, including lawyers, hairdressers, home and auto repair companies, and real estate agents.

During a vote on an education reform bill in the 2021 legislative session, Griffith introduced an amendment that would limit tax increases for education funding.

Voting rights
Griffith introduced legislation in the 2021 legislative session that would allow active-duty military members to electronically register to vote and request an absentee ballot and make public colleges and universities produce plans to encourage students to vote. The bill passed and became law on May 30, 2021.

References

Republican Party members of the Maryland House of Delegates
Living people
21st-century American politicians
Year of birth missing (living people)